The Chitwan Chepang Hill Trail is one week trekking route that runs from Hugdi River near Krishna Bhir, Dhading District and ends at Shaktikhor, Chitwan District. The Chitwan Chepang Hill Trail passes through remote village of Chepang.

References

Trails